Tannin ( tannīn;  tannīnā plural: tannīnē;  , ultimately from Akkadian  𒆗𒉌𒈾 dannina) or Tunnanu (Ugaritic: 𐎚𐎐𐎐 tnn, likely vocalized tunnanu) was a sea monster in Canaanite and Hebrew mythology used as a symbol of chaos and evil.

Canaanite mythology
Tannin appears in the Baal Cycle as one of the servants of Yam defeated by Baʿal or bound by his sister, Anat. He is usually depicted as serpentine, possibly with a double tail.

Hebrew mythology
The tanninim also appear in the Hebrew Bible's Book of Genesis, Exodus, Deuteronomy, Psalms, Job, Ezekiel, Isaiah, and Jeremiah. They are explicitly listed among the creatures created by God on the fifth day of the Genesis creation narrative, translated in the King James Version as "great whales". The tannin is listed in the apocalypse of Isaiah as among the sea beasts to be slain by Yahweh "on that day", translated in the King James Version as "the dragon".

In Judaism, Tannin is sometimes conflated with the related sea monsters Leviathan and Rahab by Christians. Along with Rahab, "Tannin" was a name applied to ancient Egypt after the Exodus to Canaan.

The word Tannin is used in the Hebrew Bible fourteen times. Aaron's staff  becomes Tannin in the Book of Exodus (Exodus 7:9-12), it is used in the meaning "snake" in the Book of Deuteronomy (Deut 32:33) and Psalms (Psalm 91:13). It represents Nebuchadnezzar II (the king of Babylon) in Jeremiah (Jeremiah 51:34) and Pharaoh in Ezekiel (Ezekiel 29:3, 32:2). In the Book of Job (Job 7:12) the protagonist questions God "Am I the sea or the sea dragon that you have set a guard over me?"

The name has subsequently been given to three submarines in the Israeli Navy: the first, an S-class submarine formerly known as HMS Springer, was in commission from 1958 until 1972. The second, a Gal-class submarine, was in commission from 1977 until 2002. The third INS Tanin is a Dolphin-class submarine in commission since 2014.

Modern Hebrew 

In modern Hebrew usage, the word tanin (תנין) means crocodile.

See also 
 
 Lotan

Notes

References

Citations

Bibliography 
 .

 .
 .
 .

See also 
 Illuyanka

Animals in the Bible
Book of Genesis
Dragons
Hebrew words and phrases
Jewish legendary creatures
Serpents in the Bible
Levantine mythology
Leviathan
Sea monsters
Arabian legendary creatures